Lai Ning (20 October 1973 – 13 March 1988) was a teenage schoolboy in China, who died while fighting a forest fire in Shimian County, Sichuan.  Lai Ning's actions were deemed heroic by the Chinese government and Lai has been celebrated as a hero and martyr in contemporary China.

Personal life and death
Lai Ning was a fourteen-year-old schoolboy living in Shimian County where he was regarded as a loner by his classmates.   On March 13, 1988, a wildfire was threatening a nearby forest and schoolchildren were mobilized to help fight the fire.  Lai voluntarily assisted the firefighting efforts for five hours.  Lai was eventually overcome by the flames and killed in the fire.

Legacy
Lai Ning was later declared a "revolutionary martyr" by the Chinese government for his role in combating the wildfire to protect his town.  Over the next year, his story was used increasingly in Chinese propaganda as a model of courage and duty for Chinese youth.  This was especially important in the aftermath of the 1989 Tiananmen Square protests when the Chinese government hoped to gain support from Chinese teenagers and promote an alternative example of youth in China.  Deng Yingchao declared that "only by plunging into studies of Lai Ning can you become the sound new masters of your country in the 21st century" in the People's Daily.

Since that time, Lai Ning has been commemorated with posters in school classrooms and statues in town squares.  In the 1990s, Lai's story was taught in Chinese textbooks to teach students about the importance of protecting Chinese society.  The propaganda surrounding Lai Ning was sometimes poorly received within China, and some teachers believed that the calls for emulation were outdated tactics from the Cultural Revolution era.

A miniseries depicting Lai Ning's life was aired in the years following his death and a film was released in 1993.

References

Further reading
Remembering Lai Ning Editorial Committee, Remembering Lai Ning (Peking: Xueyuan chubanshe, 1990) [in Chinese]
Robert Tanner, "Lei Feng and Lai Ning: The Search for Ideological and Moral Models in New China", Wittenburg East Asian Studies Journal, vol. 16 (1991), pp. 105–113

1973 births
1988 deaths
Chinese children
Deaths from fire
People from Ya'an